At least two ships of the French Navy have borne the name Cosmao:

 , a  launched in 1861 and stricken in 1881
 , a  launched in 1889 and stricken in 1922

French Navy ship names